Carnen Ua Cadhla, king of Conmaicne Mara, died 1014.

Ua Cadhla commanded a contingent of the Conmaice Mara at the Battle of Clontarf. His surname is now rendered as Kealy or Keeley.

References

 Connemara:Listening to the wind, p. 302, Tim Robinson, .

People from County Galway
1014 deaths
Year of birth unknown
People of Conmaicne Mara